Ma Siu Kwan (born 28 March 1991) is a former Hong Kong professional footballer who played as a defender.

References

External links
Ma Siu Kwan at HKFA

1991 births
Living people
Hong Kong footballers
Fourway Athletics players
Happy Valley AA players
Tuen Mun SA players
Hong Kong First Division League players
Association football defenders